YouTube is an American video-sharing website headquartered in San Bruno, California.

"Lm3allem" by Moroccan singer Saad Lamjarred is the most-viewed Arabic music video with 900 million views in February 2021. "Ya Lili" by Tunisian singer Balti with Hammouda is the second video to garner over 700 million views. "Happy Happy" by Bahrani singer Hala Al Turk become the first Arabic music video to cross 100 million views. This is a list of the most-viewed Arabic music videos on YouTube.

As of February 2021, 12 videos have exceeded 400 million views.

Top videos
The following table lists top-10 most-viewed Arabic music videos on YouTube with their approximative view count, artist, and upload date.

Notes

See also
 List of most-viewed YouTube videos
 Arabic pop music
 Arabic rock
 Music of Africa
 Music of Asia
 Music of Bahrain
 Music of Iraq

References

Lists of YouTube videos
Lists of music videos
Dynamic lists
Arabic music
Internet in Africa
Internet in Asia
Arabic music videos